The Region of Maradi is one of seven Region of Niger.  It is located in south-central Niger, east of the Region of Tahoua, west of Zinder, and north of the Nigerian city of Katsina. The administrative centre is at Maradi. The population of the Region is predominantly Hausa.

History 
In 2021, a large gold mine collapse in the region killed 18 miners.

Geography
Maradi borders Agadez Region to the north, Zinder Region to the east, Nigeria to the south (specifically the states of Katsina, Zamfara and Sokoto), and Tahoua Region to the west. Most of the 35,100 km² of land is classified as "Sahel", though the northern parts merge into the Sahara desert, and the very southern edges along the border with Nigeria get almost 600 mm a year in average rainfall, with some areas receiving as much as 650–700 mm in better years. Lake Madarounfa lies to the south of Maradi, into which flow the seasonal Goulbi N'Gabi and Goulbi N'Maradi rivers.

Settlements
Maradi is the regional capital; other major settlements include Adjekoria, Aguie, Attantane, Azagor, Bader Goula, Baoudetta, Bermo, Birni Lalle, Chadakori, Dakoro, Dan-Goulbi, Djiratawa, El Allassane Maireyrey, Gababedji, Gabi, Gangara, Gazaoua, Guidan Amoumoune, Guidan Roumji, Guidan Sori, Hawandawaki, Issawane, Kanan-Bakache, Kollo, Koona, Korahane, Korgom, Kornaka, Madarounfa, Maiyara, Mar-Jirgui, Mayahi, Ourafane, Roumboui, Sabon-Machi, Safo, Sarkin Haoussa, Sarkin Yamma, Tagriss, Tchadoua, Tchake, Tessaoua and Tibiri.

Administrative subdivisions

Maradi is divided into 6 Departments:
 Aguie Department
 Dakoro Department
 Guidan Roumdji Department
 Madarounfa Department
 Mayahi Department
 Tessaoua Department

Economy
The Niger-Nigeria border dips south below the Region's capital, forming an area sometimes called the "breadbasket" of Niger. While tobacco, mangoes, wheat, soy beans and even cotton are cultivated in some areas, the predominant crops are groundnuts, grown as a commercially, and millet, sorghum and cow peas, typically grown for domestic consumption.

Demographics
Maradi is most densely populated region of Niger, with a population of 3,117,810 as of 2011. Culturally, Maradi Region forms the west central section of Nigerien Hausaland, which extends along the Nigerian border west to Dogondoutchi and east to just beyond Zinder. Other groups include the Fula people (including the Wodaabe, who predominate to the north and east of the region), and Tuareg peoples, especially in the north of the region and along major trade routes. The Tagdal language, thought to be a mixed Songhay-Tuareg language, is also spoken.

See also
Regions of Niger
Departments of Niger
Communes of Niger

References

External links

 
Regions of Niger